The 2014 SaskTel Tankard, the provincial men's curling championship for Saskatchewan, was held from January 29 to February 2 at the Crescent Point Wickenheiser Centre in Shaunavon. The winning Steve Laycock team represented Saskatchewan at the 2014 Tim Hortons Brier in Kamloops.

Teams
The teams are listed as follows:

Knockout Draw Brackets
The draw is listed as follows:

A Event

B Event

C Event

Playoffs

1 vs. 2
Saturday, February 1, 7:00 pm

3 vs. 4
Saturday, February 1, 7:00 pm

Semifinal
Sunday, February 2, 9:30 am

Final
Sunday, February 2, 2:00 pm

References

External links

2014 Tim Hortons Brier
Curling in Saskatchewan